Sir Haydn Tudor Evans (20 June 1920 – 22 March 2012) was a British barrister and judge. Appointed to the High Court in 1974, he sat in the Family Division from 1974 to 1978 and in the Queen's Bench Division from 1978 to 1994.

Born in Cardiff, Tudor Evans was the fourth son of John Edgar Evans and Ellen (née Stringer).

References 

 https://www.ukwhoswho.com/view/10.1093/ww/9780199540891.001.0001/ww-9780199540884-e-38148
 https://www.thetimes.co.uk/article/sir-hadyn-tudor-evans-7vmskw0gd6q

Knights Bachelor
Family Division judges
1920 births
2012 deaths
Queen's Bench Division judges
Fleet Air Arm personnel of World War II
Fleet Air Arm aviators
Royal Naval Volunteer Reserve personnel of World War II
Welsh King's Counsel
Alumni of Lincoln College, Oxford
20th-century King's Counsel
Members of Lincoln's Inn